Pseudocypraea is a genus of sea snails, marine gastropod mollusks in the family Ovulidae, one of the families of cowry allies.

Species
Species within the genus Pseudocypraea include:

Pseudocypraea adamsonii (Sowerby, 1832)
Pseudocypraea alexhuberti Lorenz, 2006
Pseudocypraea exquisita Petuch, 1979

References

Pediculariinae